San Giorgio Maggiore is one of the islands of Venice, Italy.

San Giorgio Maggiore may also refer to:

 San Giorgio Maggiore (church), Venice, a basilica church on the island
 San Giorgio Maggiore (Monet series), a series of Impressionist paintings of the island by Claude Monet
 San Giorgio Maggiore at Dusk, one of the series
 San Giorgio Maggiore, Naples, a basilica church in Naples, Italy

See also 
 San Giorgio (disambiguation)